Af Urur is a village in the Puntland region of Somalia, located on the Golis Mountains, somewhat far from Bosaso, but its exact location is not known. The settlement is placed at a strategically important location, and has thus become strongly contested during the Somali Civil War. One of the most prominent clans in the village are the Tiinle.

History
Promixal to the al-Shabaab-controlled Galgala hills, the village has been attacked and captured by the militant group several times. Af Urur contains a camp for a contingent of the Darawish paramilitary group, which have been fighting al-Shabab.

In June 2017, Af Urur was the site of an attack by al-Shabaab militants against a Somali military encampment, leading to between 20 and 70 deaths. It was one of the deadliest al-Shabaab attacks in Puntland.

Al-Shabaab again attacked and fully occupied the village on 20 July 2018. Af Urur was subsequently retaken by Puntland's military, but the local garrison retreated on 8 June 2019, allowing al-Shabaab to capture it once again. On 11 June, Darawish troops counterattacked, and restored control over Af Urur.

References

Populated places in Somalia
Puntland